Sanskrit Kavya literature has a long history of its development. The idea of sending of a message, through a messenger, from one person to another is not to be found wanting in the Hindu epics but it was taken up as an independent theme for a poem firstly by Ghatakarpara and later on by Kalidasa, Dhoyi, Udaya, Bhavabhuti and many other poets of note. sandesh kavya also called DutaKavya or message poem Sandesha Kavya  (IAST: sandeśa-kāvya) belongs to the category of Khandakavya.

Overview
In Sanskrit language, sandeśa (संदेश) means "message", and kāvya (काव्य) means "poem" or "poetry". Sandesha kavya deals with the sending of a message through the agency of a messenger (Duta). The idea of sending a message through a messenger (Duta) is old and familiar in literature.

Ghatakarpara’s Sandesha Kavya

The fore-runner of Sandesha Kavya is a small poem bearing the title - "Poem of the Broken-jug" which is a poem by Ghatakarpara on the message sent to the husband by a wife who was in grief on account of separation; it deals with the lamentation of the abandoned wife who does not address her lamentation to one person alone but to the monsoon clouds, her confidante, her distant husband and some trees but none of them entrusted with the task of carrying her message. The poem is of twenty-four stanzas in five different metres. Even though nothing is known about the poet except his name which stands mentioned at the very end of the poem but he is believed to be contemporary of Kalidasa and one of the Nine Gems in the court of Vikramāditya, though he does not reach the lofty, subtle, romantic height of Kalidasa. Abhinavagupta holds the view that this poem was actually written by Kalidasa, and has written a commentary on it, but the construction etc., of the poem indicates that Kalidasa did not write this poem.

Eminent Sandesha kavyas

In Kalidasa’s Meghadūta, the messenger is the cloud, in Dohyi’s Pavanadūta, the messenger is the wind, in Udaya’s Mayurasandeśa, the messenger is the peacock.

The methodology employed by Kalidāsa in the construction of his Meghadūta, a lyric in a little over one hundred verses that personifies objects of Nature and describes Nature with all its beauties and glories, has been imitated by later Sanskrit poets.

Pavanadhuta is written by Dhoyin a 12th century CE court poet the Gauda king Lakshmana of the Sena dynasty. The poet narrates tells the story of a gandharva maiden Kuvalayavatī who falls in love with King Lakshmana. She asks the wind (Pavan) to take her message of love to the king.

Bhavabhuti used this metre for Act IX 25-26 of his Mālatīmādhava in which the abandoned Mādhava searching for a cloud to take his message to Mālatī speaks in Mandākrāntā metre.

These apart, there is the message sent by a devotee to the Lord described in Hamsasandeśa of Venkatanātha Vedāntadeśika, and the message from the wife to husband in Cakorasandeśa of Vāsudeva of Payyur.

Arrangement of content

Sandeśa kāvyas are always in two parts; in the first part, the hero is presented, there appears the messenger and the route to the destination is described. The second part includes the destination, the house of the heroine, the heroine and her state of grief in separation, the message describing the hero’s own condition and a word of solace, with an identification mark mentioning some incident the hero and the heroine could know, to assure that the messenger is genuine. The messenger can be anyone – a person, a bird, a bee or a cloud or wind, and that messenger provides very interesting descriptions of cities en route with palaces and temples, pubs and parks, theatres, mansions and streets; the country parts and forests, hills and rivers, animals and birds, trees, creepers and flowers, cultivated fields and peasant girls, artisans. Love in separation is the chief emotion depicted in this type of lyrical poetry and there is certain individuality in the treatment of the theme; this type of poetry is not found in any other literature.

Mandākrāntā metre

The metre used is known as Mandākrāntā which is slow-moving and consists of pada of four lines each, with each line of seventeen syllables as in Kālidāsa's poem Meghadūta Stanza 15:

रत्नच्छायाव्यतिकर इव प्रेक्ष्यमेमत् पुरुस्ताद् वल्मीकाग्रात् प्रभवति धनुष्खण्डमाखण्डलस्य |
येन श्यामं वपुरतितरां कान्तिमापत्स्यते ते बर्हेणेव स्फुरितरुचीना गोपवेशस्य विष्णोः ||१५||

| – – – – | u u u u u – | – u – – u – x |

"Like the blending of tints in the jewels, to the Eastward, at the top of the mountain of Valmīkā, will appear a portion of a bow of Akhandala (Indra), by means of which thy dark blue body will gain excessive beauty, like that of the Shepherd clad Vishnu (Lord Krishna) from peacock’s tail, which possesses glittering beauty."

In other Indian languages
Sandesha Kavyas are found written in many other Indian languages. Unnuneeli Sandesham, one of the oldest literary works in Malayalam language is composed as a Sandesha Kavya.

References

Sanskrit poetry
Sanskrit words and phrases